Barking is the eighth studio album by British electronic group Underworld, released on 2 September 2010. The lead single, "Scribble", produced with Welsh drum and bass producer High Contrast, was released on 28 June 2010. The band released a radio edit of the track for free download on their website on 13 May 2010.

Each track on the album was written by band members Karl Hyde and Rick Smith in Essex, before being sent to producers well known for their contributions to trance, drum and bass and dubstep. The album sees further collaboration with Mark Knight and D. Ramirez, whose 2009 single, "Downpipe", featured lyrics and vocals by Hyde.

Barking received positive reviews from most music critics. The album debuted at number twenty-six on the UK Albums Chart, selling 5,146 copies in its first week.

There are seven slightly modified variations of the cover artwork - depending on edition and format - all created by John Warwicker.

The album is named after Barking, an eastern borough of London.

Critical reception
Barking received positive reviews from most music critics. At Metacritic, which assigns a normalized rating out of 100 to reviews from mainstream critics, the album received an average score of 67, based on 18 reviews, which indicates "generally favorable reviews". Barry Walters of Spin wrote, "with production help from High Contrast, Dubfire, and Paul Van Dyk, Underworld is freed up to focus on crafting memorable tunes that hark back to their electronica heyday, as well as more personal, coherent lyrics. Earnest emotions surprisingly suit these dance-floor surrealists." BBC Music's Sarah Bee gave the album a positive review, stating: "There's a lightness and a jollity about their music which combines with an unabashed poignancy, and there's a sense of deep contentment and peace about this album. They may not be sticking their necks out as pioneers now but it's not important – they are never less than themselves, and superficial quibbles aside this is the sound of musicians with nothing to prove and everything to give." Record Collector reviewer Daryl Easlea said the album is "possibly Underworld’s poppiest ever [...] yet [it] retains their trademark dark heart". She concluded: "With its tremendous focus, Barking ably demonstrates that, after six albums, Underworld remain the UK’s leading old-school dance combo."
Michaelangelo Matos from The A.V. Club described the album as "in some ways, the most tuneful Underworld album yet, which isn’t saying a lot". The NME gave the album a mixed review, stating that the album "tends to fail when it experiments", but praised the songs "Bird 1" and "Moon in Water" for being "in the vein of classic Underworld, simultaneously danceable and menacingly strange."

Resident Advisor reviewer Ian Mathers said the duo "marries a renewed emphasis on the dance floor with unabashedly open-hearted lyrics", and felt that "the songs here are a harmonious marriage of the classic, propulsive Underworld sound and the kind of techniques and textures that postdate most of their career." Ben Weisz of musicOMH gave the album a favourable review, and concluded: "Barking is a mostly-solid album let down by a couple of weak links. It's not earth-shattering, and there are no new Born Slippys, but it's well worth a listen." Australian dance music website inthemix stated that "Barking will, as the frontman seems to suggest, take the group to a new audience – or realign them with the heady days of Born Slippy". Stephen Lussier of The Spill Magazine comments, "The album’s core echoes of a time when careful attention was taken in connecting electronica and vocal expression, thus making this an unquestionably more lyrically-driven album."  A reviewer from Music Week felt that the album "is less of a return to form then a continuation of what has come before, from the euphoric dance floor fillers of Between The Stars and Always Loved A Film to the gentle raw piano off closing track Louisiana with the end result reeking in nostalgia of the duo’s mid-90s heyday." 
In his review for Drowned in Sound, Alex Barker wrote: "This record can be seen as a work of celebration [...] while residing in the comforting notion that they have already proven all that they have to prove. Or it could be considered a somewhat lazy effort, a work more poppy than anything they have previously produced and one in which they know will sell well."

Track listing

Standard edition

Deluxe Edition

Limited Edition

Formats
Standard edition – CD jewel case edition containing 9 tracks with an 8-page roll-fold booklet.
Deluxe Edition – CD and DVD in a 3-panel cardboard packaging with 8-page roll-fold booklet, containing 9 tracks and a DVD with music videos for each track.
Limited Edition – Box set containing book pack of 32-page artwork and the 9 track CD, an additional CD with alternate versions and a DVD with music videos for each track including two not present on the Deluxe Edition.

Charts

In 2010 it was awarded a silver certification from the Independent Music Companies Association, which indicated sales of at least 30,000 copies throughout Europe.

Release history

References

2010 albums
Underworld (band) albums
Cooking Vinyl albums
Om Records albums